Insaaf, also known as Insaaf: The Final Justice, is a 1997 Indian Bollywood action film directed and written by Dayal Nihalani and starring Akshay Kumar, Shilpa Shetty and Paresh Rawal. It was released on 30 May 1997.

A witness to a murder is killed and honest police officer Vikram lays a trap to catch the killers by getting his girlfriend to pose as the witness. They do succeed, but also make a shocking discovery.

Cast

Soundtrack

References

External links 
 

1997 films
1990s action drama films
1990s Hindi-language films
Films scored by Anand–Milind
Films scored by Sandeep Chowta
1997 drama films